This is a list of waterways that form the Gulf Intracoastal Waterway and crossings (bridges, tunnels and ferries) across it. The list runs from west to east (Brownsville, Texas to Carrabelle, Florida), in order of decreasing mile markers to Harvey, Louisiana and increasing after Harvey.

Texas

Brownsville Ship Channel
Port Isabel Ship Channel
South Garcia Street Drawbridge
Laguna Madre
Queen Isabella Causeway
Manmade canal
Laguna Madre
Manmade canal
Baffin Bay
Manmade canal
John F. Kennedy Memorial Causeway
Corpus Christi Bay
Manmade canal
Redfish Bay
Redfish Bay Causeway (TX 361)
Manmade canal
Aransas Bay
Manmade canal
San Antonio Bay
Manmade canal
Matagorda Bay
Manmade canal
Oyster Lake
Manmade canal
Colorado River Locks (West side)
Colorado River
Manmade canal
Colorado River Locks (East side)
FM 2031 Bridge (FM 2031)
Manmade canal
East Matagorda Bay
Manmade canal
Sergeant Joe Parks, Jr. Memorial Bridge (FM 457)
Manmade canal
San Bernard River
Manmade canal
Brazos River
West Gate of the Brazos River
East Gate of the Brazos River
Manmade canal
Quintana Swing Bridge (FM 1495)
Surfside Bridge (TX 332)
Manmade canal
Galveston Bay
West Bay
Galveston Causeway
Galveston Bay
Bolivar Ferry
Manmade canal
Sievers Cove
Manmade canal
East Bay
Manmade canal
Trinity River
Manmade canal
Texas 124 Bridge (TX 124)
Sabine–Neches Waterway
South Gulfway Drive Bridge (TX 87)
Taylor Bayou
Manmade canal
Martin Luther King Bridge (Port Arthur, Texas)
Neches River
Sabine Lake
Sabine River

Louisiana

Sabine River
Manmade canal
Gum Cove Ferry
Ellender Bridge (LA 27)
Calcasieu River
Manmade canal
Black Bayou Pontoon Bridge (LA 384)
Grand Lake Pontoon Bridge (LA 384)
Gibbstown Bridge (LA 27)
Forked Island Bridge (LA 82)
Louisa Bridge (LA 319)
Ferry to Cote Blanche Island
LA 317 bridge at North Bend
Atchafalaya River
Bayou Boeuf
Bayou Chene
Bayou Black
Bayou Cocodrie
Lake Cocodrie
Manmade canal
Bayou Dularge
Bayou Dularge Bridge (LA 315)
Houma Navigational Canal
Houma Tunnel (LA 3040)
East Main Street Bridge (LA 24 eastbound)
East Park Avenue Bridge (LA 24 westbound)
LA 3087 bridge
LA 316 bridge
Larose-Bourg Cutoff (manmade)
West Larose Bridge (LA 1)
Manmade canal
LA 308 bridge
Bayou Barataria
LA 3134 bridge
Harvey Canal (manmade)
Lapalco Boulevard Bridge
Harvey Tunnel and bridge (U.S. Highway 90 Business/Future I-49)
Harvey Canal Bridge (LA 18)
Mississippi River
Jackson Avenue-Gretna Ferry
Crescent City Connection (U.S. Highway 90 Business/Future I-49)
Canal Street Ferry
Industrial Canal (manmade)
St. Claude Avenue Bridge (LA 46)
Claiborne Avenue Bridge (LA 39)
Florida Avenue Bridge (road and railroad)
Mississippi River-Gulf Outlet Canal (manmade)
Paris Road Bridge (LA 47)
Manmade canal
Lake Borgne

Mississippi
Mississippi Sound
Ship Island Ferry

Alabama

Mississippi Sound
Dauphin Island Bridge
Mobile Bay
Bon Secour Bay
Manmade canal
 Alabama 59
 Foley Beach Express
Perdido Bay
Perdido Pass

Florida

Big Lagoon
Pensacola Bay
 Pensacola Pass
 Pensacola Beach Bridge
 Florida 399
 Brooks Bridge US 98
Santa Rosa Sound
Choctawhatchee Bay
 Florida 293
 US 331
West Bay
 Florida 79
 US 98
St. Andrews Bay
 East Bay
 US 98
 CR 386
 Florida 71
Manmade canal
Apalachicola Bay
 John Gorrie Bridge (US 98/US 319)
 Florida 300
St. George Sound

See also
Waterways forming and crossings of the Atlantic Intracoastal Waterway

References 

Gulf Intracoastal Waterway
Gulf Intracoastal Waterway
Gulf
Gulf Intracoastal Waterway